Buoyem is a town in the Bono East region of Ghana. The town is known for the Buoyem High School.  The school is a second cycle institution.

References

Populated places in the Bono East Region